Quch Ghar (also Romanized as Qūch Ghār and Qūchghār; also known as Koshkar, Qareh Bolāgh, Qoshkar, and Qūchqār) is a village in Kaghazkonan-e Shomali Rural District, Kaghazkonan District, Meyaneh County, East Azerbaijan Province, Iran. At the 2006 census, its population was 79, in 32 families.

References 

Populated places in Meyaneh County